On January 5, 2020, Cédric Chouviat, a 42-year-old French delivery man, died after his arrest by Parisian police after using his cellphone while on his scooter and contempt of a police officer. A coroner later ruled that he had died of asphyxia and a broken larynx. During the arrest, after Chouviat called one of the officers "a fool" and an officer went behind him and locked his arm around Chouviat's neck causing him to fall to the ground. While on the ground officers continued to restrain him and handcuffed him, during which he suffered a heart attack and was administered aid after officers noticed his skin turning blue.

Incident 
Police reportedly stopped Chouviat, as it appeared that Chouviat was using his cell phone while driving his mobile scooter, near the Eiffel Tower on January 3. In one of the videos Chouviat, can be heard mocking the police officers who stopped him by calling them "clowns" and stating that "without your uniform, in the street you are nothing at all". His comments caused the officers to insult and mock Chouviat with one officer threatens to arrest Chouviat for insulting the officers, while another is recorded shoving Chouviat multiple times.

Once the officers arrest Chouviat, they reportedly used a chokehold to subdue him with three other officers pinning him to the ground while Chouviat was wearing his motorcycle helmet. During the arrest, Chouviat is recorded as stating "Stop", "I'm Stopping" and repeatedly stating "I'm suffocating".

The incident was documented in at least thirteen different videos that were filmed by Chouviat, bystanders and one of the officers involved in the arrest.

Investigation 
On January 7, the Paris Public Prosecutor opened a judicial inquiry for involuntary manslaughter, and the organization that investigates the police also opened an investigation into the death. 

A lawyer for two of the officers involved in the arrest claims that the motorcycle helmet worn by Chouviat muffled his voice enough that they did not hear his comments and when shown the videos, the officers were "surprised and devastated" by the audio.

Response 
Lawyers for the Chouviat family released statements at a press conference, calling for the public to maintain calm and that "France isn't the United States, but France is becoming like the United States." The lawyers highlighted the main concern is the techniques that were used by police on Chouviat that caused his death. His family have called for the ban on the use of chokeholds by French police and have compared his death to the murder of George Floyd, with his widow stating; "You have a citizen who's asking to live and is a victim of injustice and violence to the point of losing his life. Its copy-paste."

The death of Chouviat was specifically referenced by French Interior Minister Christophe Castaner when he announced a ban on the use of chokeholds during police arrests in early June 2020, but after a string of protests from French police the ban was removed weeks later.

References 
January 2020 events in France

Filmed killings by law enforcement
Deaths from asphyxiation
Deaths in police custody in France
Deaths by person in Paris
2020 in Paris
Killings by law enforcement officers
National Police (France)